Bogdan Trifunović (28 December 193325 July 2007) was a Yugoslav and Serbian politician and diplomat who served as the last president of the Presidency of the Central Committee of the League of Communists of Serbia from 24 May 1989 to 16 July 1990.

He also served as the ambassador of FR Yugoslavia to France.

A close associate of Slobodan Milošević, he was named the vice president of the Socialist Party of Serbia (SPS) following the breakup of Yugoslavia. He left the party in 1998.

References 

1933 births
2007 deaths
League of Communists of Yugoslavia politicians
League of Communists of Serbia politicians
People from Srbobran

Yugoslav diplomats
Socialist Party of Serbia politicians